Polunino is a rural locality (a khutor) in Gornobalykleyskoye Rural Settlement, Dubovsky District, Volgograd Oblast, Russia. The population was 150 as of 2010. There are 3 streets.

Geography 
Polunino is located in steppe, on the right bank of the Kholostaya River, 75 km north of Dubovka (the district's administrative centre) by road. Lipovka is the nearest rural locality.

References 

Rural localities in Dubovsky District, Volgograd Oblast